MKA: Theatre of New Writing (often shortened to 'MK-Alpha' or 'MKA') is based in Richmond, in the Melbourne City of Yarra. It was established in March, 2010 as 'MKA Richmond', swiftly outgrowing the name to become one of the most celebrated contemporary theatre companies in Australia. A champion for new performance writers (e.g. playwrights, poets, choreographers), an increasing number of which, in the company's short history, have become established names in the industry. Productions such as The Economist, sex.violence.blood.gore a recurring season of new plays Open Season - and in 2014 the HYPRTXT Festival - and relationships with larger organisations such as Playwriting Australia have confirmed the company's position within the industry.
The company's mission includes a focus on international, though in particular Australian and Asian works. From 2014-2016 the company was supported by Creative Victoria through the triennial funding, operational investment scheme.

Venue
The company originally built a boutique 44-seat theatre at a site in Richmond, in the old Australian Knitting Mills, but due to a controversial situation in which the theatre was shut down by the Yarra Council, MKA ceased to operate the venue as anything other than an office and have since built and run nine pop-up theatres in spaces ranging from a shopping centre in the Melbourne CBD, the Prahran Mission in Prahran, an old Catholic School hall in Abbotsford, a series of spaces in a knitting mill in North Melbourne, amongst others, and have toured and transferred work nationally and abroad. The company at present does not have a permanent venue.

Name
Various theories about the name of the company have surfaced over the years. The company website offers little in the way of assistance. That the building that the initial theatre was created in is the AKM building is one possibility of the origin of the name. Another leading theory is that the name is a reference to the Project MKUltra and MKAlpha mind control trials conducted by the USA's CIA from the 1950s, allegedly to present day. Another theory posed by Co-founder Tobias Manderson-Galvin is that the name stands for Ministry of Knowledge and Art, a playful reference to George Orwell's 1984. Co-founder Glyn Roberts has stated that MKA stands for Freedom and Duty Free Scotch.

Controversy
The MKA: Theatre of New Writing has been the subject of a number of controversies, the first being the shutting down of the initial venue by local government and the second major controversy being in relation to then Artistic Director Tobias Manderson-Galvin's play 'The Economist'. Both attracted media and industry attention and debate, and garnered further support for the company from its existing niche audience base.

Leadership

Past Productions
Past productions include:

References

External links
MKA: Theatre of New Writing website

Theatre in Melbourne
Theatre companies in Australia